Hungary competed at the 2019 Military World Games held in Wuhan, China from 18 to 27 October 2019. According to the official results athletes representing Hungary won one gold medal, three silver medals and one bronze medal; instead, the medal count appears to be four rather than five (see below). The country finished in 25th place in the medal table.

Medal summary

Medal by sports

Medalists

References 
 2019 Military World Games Results

Nations at the 2019 Military World Games
Military